General Dunlap may refer to:

Charles J. Dunlap Jr. (born 1950), U.S. Air Force major general
Lillian Dunlap (1922–2003), U.S. Army brigadier general
Robert H. Dunlap (1879–1931), U.S. Marine Corps brigadier general

See also
Dawn Dunlop (fl. 1980s–2020s), U.S. Air Force major general